The Vienna Uprising or October Revolution (or ) of October 1848 was the last uprising in the Austrian Revolution of 1848.

On 6 October 1848, as the troops of the Austrian Empire were preparing to leave Vienna to suppress the Hungarian Revolution, a crowd sympathetic to the Hungarian cause (of workers, students and mutinous soldiers) tried to prevent them from leaving. The incident escalated into violent street battles; blood was spilt in Saint Stephen's Cathedral and Count Baillet von Latour, the Austrian Minister of War, was lynched by the crowd. The commander of the Vienna garrison, Count Auersperg, was obliged to evacuate the city, but he entrenched himself in a strong position outside it.

On 26 October, under the command of General Windisch-Grätz and Count Josip Jelačić, the Austrian and Croatian armies started a bombardment of Vienna, and they stormed the city centre on the 31st. The defence was led by the Polish General Józef Bem. Except for him, who managed to escape, all the leaders of the resistance were executed in the days following—including Wenzel Messenhauser, the journalist Alfred Julius Becher, Hermann Jellinek and the Radical member of parliament Robert Blum, even though he had parliamentary immunity.

The gains of the March Revolution were largely lost, and Austria began a phase of both reactionary authoritarianism—"neo-absolutism"—but also liberal reform.

See also
 Revolutions of 1848 in the Habsburg areas
 Academic Legion (Vienna)

Notes

References
 Friedrich Engels, Revolution and counter-revolution in Germany, Chapter XI: "The Vienna October Uprising"  and Chapter XII: "The storming of Vienna - the betrayal of Vienna" 
 

Revolutions of 1848 in the Austrian Empire
1848 in the Austrian Empire
19th century in Vienna